The following television stations operate on virtual channel 40 in the United States:

 K13ZQ-D in Lubbock, Texas
 K20PC-D in Centerville, Texas
 K21KJ-D in Mineral Wells, Texas
 K22OB-D in Medford, Oregon
 K27OW-D in Rochester, Minnesota
 K28QQ-D in Williston, North Dakota
 K33PE-D in Truth or Consequence, New Mexico
 K35OZ-D in Chico, California
 K40FM-D in Milton-Freewater, Oregon
 K40IJ-D in Topeka, Kansas
 K40KC-D in Tulsa, Oklahoma
 KADO-CD in Shreveport, Louisiana
 KAJN-CD in Lafayette, Louisiana
 KBMN-LD in Houston, Texas
 KCWL-LD in Monroe, Louisiana
 KEJR-LD in Phoenix, Arizona
 KEVO-LD in Reno, Nevada
 KFXB-TV in Dubuque, Iowa
 KHBS in Fort Smith, Arkansas
 KHPL-CD in La Grange, Texas
 KHPM-CD in San Marcos, Texas
 KHRR in Tucson, Arizona
 KISA-LD in San Antonio, Texas
 KMMC-LD in San Francisco, California
 KRHD-CD in Bryan, Texas
 KTBN-TV in Santa Ana, California
 KTES-LD in Abilene, Texas
 KTLM in Rio Grande City, Texas
 KTXL in Sacramento, California
 KXLK-CD in Austin, Texas
 W14EQ-D in Tupelo, Mississippi
 W26EU-D in Boston, Massachusetts
 W34FF-D in Panama City, Florida
 WAAO-LD in Andalusia, Alabama
 WBUY-TV in Holly Springs, Mississippi
 WDBD in Jackson, Mississippi
 WEIN-LD in Evansville, Indiana
 WESV-LD in Chicago, Illinois
 WGGB-TV in Springfield, Massachusetts
 WGWW in Anniston, Alabama
 WHMB-TV in Indianapolis, Indiana
 WICZ-TV in Binghamton, New York
 WKUW-LD in White House, Tennessee
 WLFB in Bluefield, West Virginia
 WLMB in Toledo, Ohio
 WMGM-TV in Wildwood, New Jersey
 WMJQ-CD in Syracuse, New York
 WMTJ in Fajardo, Puerto Rico
 WMYA-TV in Anderson, South Carolina
 WNJJ-LD in New York, New York
 WNKY in Bowling Green, Kentucky
 WPCB-TV in Greensburg, Pennsylvania
 WRCX-LD in Dayton, Ohio
 WTWC-TV in Tallahassee, Florida
 WUVC-DT in Fayetteville, North Carolina
 WVDM-LD in Quincy, Illinois
 WVEB-LD in Florence, South Carolina
 WVVC-LD in Utica, New York
 WWDD-LD in Havre de Grace, Maryland
 WWSB in Sarasota, Florida
 WYAT-LD in Martinsville, Virginia
 WYCI in Saranac Lake, New York

The following stations formerly operated on virtual channel 40, but are no longer licensed:
 K26NT-D in Granite Falls, Minnesota
 K40HE-D in Redding, California
 K40KQ-D in Wyola, Montana
 K40LJ-D in Lincoln, Nebraska
 WODF-LD in Rockford, Illinois
 WYDJ-LD in Myrtle Beach, South Carolina

References

40 virtual